Liquid Nutrition (Liquid Nutrition Group Inc.) is a Canadian company that provides functional beverages, such as meal replacement supplements, sport drinks, as well as fruit and vegetable based juices and smoothies, through franchised stores and authorized third parties in Canada and other countries. The company was listed on the TSX Venture Exchange between March 31, 2010 and September 21, 2015.

History
Liquid Nutrition was founded in 2004 by Matt Hill and James Kane, ex-rugby players and entrepreneurs. The store quickly attracted attention from future investors, Chantal Chamandy and Greg Chamandy (co-founder and former executive of Gildan Activewear. Greg and Chantal integrated vitamins and supplements into Liquid Nutrition, creating inventive combinations of fruit, juices, almond milk and neutraceuticals. Their fusion of naturally flavoured, intensely healthy functional beverages found an immediate demand.

Stores are currently operating in Montreal, Toronto, Oakville, Vancouver and the Bahamas.  Liquid Nutrition has sold over 100 stores to date, and plans to have 350+ stores open within the next five years. An international license agreement has also been reached for the Middle East and North Africa region (MENA).

On May 16, 2011, Limehill Capital Corporation (TSX VENTURE:LHL.P) and Liquid Nutrition Group Inc. announced the amalgamated company named Liquid Nutrition Group Inc.
Following the amalgamation, LQD.V went live on the TSX.V on May 25, 2011.

Starting from January 1, 2015, Liquid Nutrition took the big step to become an Organic, Vegan (Plant-Based) & Gluten-Free Juice & Smoothie bar. Drastically changing their entire menu, Liquid Nutrition now offers a line of Organic, Cold-Pressed Juices, as well as  Raw Soups, DragonFruit & Acai Smoothie-Bowls, Shots & snacks.

Products
Liquid Nutrition's mission is "to enlighten and educate our community that eating and living healthy is fun, easy, quick and delicious."
They have chosen to only include fruit, ice, and other nutritional supplements and powders in their drinks.  Unhealthy ingredients, such as the ice cream, sorbets and yogurt bases are not used in their products.

Liquid Nutrition's product line includes Organic, Vegan & Gluten-Free  functional beverages (smoothies) Cold-Pressed & Regular Juices, Snacks, Protein Bars, and a wide selection of retail supplements ( such as plant-based protein powders, whole food vitamin supplements, greens, sports supplements, etc.).

References 

Companies formerly listed on the TSX Venture Exchange
Drink companies of Canada
Food and drink companies based in Montreal